is a Japanese manga written and illustrated by Sanae Rokuya. It was collected into a bound volume by Oakla Publishing. It is licensed in North America by 801 Media, which released the manga in January 2008.

Reception
Leroy Douresseaux, writing for Comic Book Bin, praised the author's "eclectic scenarios and shamelessly physical boy loving". Briana Lawrence, writing for Mania Entertainment, felt that the stories were resolved too quickly in favour of showing sex scenes.

References

External links
 

Yaoi anime and manga
Manga anthologies
2007 manga
Digital Manga Publishing titles